Dinh may refer to:

Dinh
pronounced "zinh" or "yinh"
Dinh River (Bà Rịa–Vũng Tàu), river in Bà Rịa–Vũng Tàu, one of five rivers named Sông Dinh in Vietnam.
núi Dinh, hills in Bà Rịa–Vũng Tàu, Vietnam

Đình
pronounced "dinh"
Đình, Vietnamese communal temple

Đinh
Đinh Dynasty 
 Đinh Dynasty, the imperial dynasty of Vietnam from 968 to 980
 Đinh Bộ Lĩnh (924–979), considered the first king in the history of Vietnam
 Đinh Phế Đế (974–1001), second and last king of the Dinh dynasty and son of Dinh Bo Linhand surname
People:
 Dinh (surname), a Vietnamese family name

See also
Other given names:
 Lê Long Đĩnh (986–1009), last king (1005–09) of the Anterior Lê Dynasty of Vietnam
 Khải Định (1885–1925), 12th emperor of the Nguyễn Dynasty in Vietnam
 Tôn Thất Đính (born c. 1926), South Vietnamese lieutenant general and a key figure in the 1963 coup that deposed President Ngô Đình Diệm
 Trương Định (1820–64), a mandarin in the Nguyễn Dynasty of Vietnam and a guerrilla leader
 Dinh Gilly (1877–1940), French-Algerian operatic baritone and teacher

In popular culture:
 In Stephen King's The Dark Tower (series), a dinh is the word for the leader of a ka-tet, or group bound by fate.